The  Iowa Barnstormers season was the 11th season for the franchise, and the 7th in the Arena Football League. The team was coached by J. T. Smith, who took over as interim head coach on May 17 after John Gregory resigned. The Barnstormers played their home games at Wells Fargo Arena.

Standings

Regular season schedule
The Barnstormers had a bye week in Week 1, and so they began the season on the road against the Pittsburgh Power on March 19. Their home opener was on March 25 against the Spokane Shock. On July 23, they hosted the Georgia Force in their final regular season game.

Roster

Regular season

Week 1: BYE

Week 2: at Pittsburgh Power

Week 3: vs. Spokane Shock

Week 4: at San Jose SaberCats

Week 5: at Kansas City Command

Week 6: vs. Chicago Rush

Week 7: at Tulsa Talons

Week 8: vs. Philadelphia Soul

Week 9: at Dallas Vigilantes

Week 10: at Jacksonville Sharks

Week 11: BYE

Week 12: vs. Utah Blaze

Week 13: vs. Orlando Predators

Week 14: at Arizona Rattlers

Week 15: vs. Dallas Vigilantes

Week 16: at Chicago Rush

Week 17: vs. Tulsa Talons

Week 18: vs. Kansas City Command

Week 19: at Milwaukee Mustangs

Week 20: vs. Georgia Force

References

Iowa Barnstormers
Iowa Barnstormers seasons
Barn